Sainte-Marie-Saint-Raphaël (unofficially Ste-Marie-St-Raphaël) is a community in Gloucester County, New Brunswick, Canada. It held village status prior to 2023.

Located on Lamèque Island, the village was formed by the incorporation of most of the local service district (LSD) of St. Raphael sur-Mer and a small part of the neighbouring LSD of Haut-Lamèque. Contrary to frequent citation, it was not formed by an amalgamation involving a village named Sainte-Marie.

History

In May 1971, an anxious Acadian fishing population demanded a public hearing into the safety of the Marc Guylaine, and 400 people met at the Saint-Raphaël community centre where an "action group" was commissioned to study the issue. Ultimately the last of the "cursed" sister ships was found to be unseaworthy.

On 1 January 2023, Sainte-Marie-Saint-Raphaël amalgamated with the town of Lamèque and all or part of ten local service districts to form the new town of Île-de-Lamèque. The community's name remains in official use.

Demographics

Language

Notable people

See also
List of communities in New Brunswick

References

Communities in Gloucester County, New Brunswick
Former villages in New Brunswick